Jungle Thangata (born 15 March 1948) is a Malawian boxer. He competed in the men's featherweight event at the 1972 Summer Olympics.

References

1948 births
Living people
Malawian male boxers
Olympic boxers of Malawi
Boxers at the 1972 Summer Olympics
Place of birth missing (living people)
Featherweight boxers